Paul Jay Fairchild (born September 14, 1961) is a former professional American football guard in the National Football League. He played seven seasons for the New England Patriots (1984–1990).  Fairchild grew up in Glidden, Iowa where he played football for the Wildcats at Glidden-Ralston High School.  

1961 births
Living people
People from Carroll, Iowa
Players of American football from Iowa
American football centers
American football offensive guards
Kansas Jayhawks football players
New England Patriots players